Hysen Bytyqi (* 5. October 1968 in Prishtina) is a Kosovo agricultural scientist who introduced animal breeding to Kosovo. He is professor of animal science and pro-rector of education and student matters at the University of Pristina

Biography 
After studying agriculture Bytyqi was in 1994 chairman of the regional Agricultural Society Malisheva which encompassed 45 communities and continued in this position until 1999. In parallel he studied at the Agricultural Faculty of Pristina University and obtained,  in 1991,  the Agricultural Diploma in animal science.

In 1999 and 2000 Bytyqi was the national representative of the Food and Agriculture Organization (FAO) as Kosovan consultant. He was responsible for the project „Agriculture 1998“, and was involved in the planning and distribution of seed supplies and agricultural goods for 1400 farmers in Kosovo. From 2000 to 2003 Bytyqi was responsible for the project „“Farm Reconstruction“ (EFRP) in the same organisation (FAO), a million dollar project with the goal of providing farmers with livestock and machines, together with modern veterinary services, and to build up the administrative organisation after the war in Kosovo. In parallel Bytygi studied at the  Agricultural University of Tirana  and in 2003 obtained his Master's Degree in Animal Breeding there.

Research areas 
2002 – 2006: National contact person for project: Unification and Improving of Selection of Domestic Animals in South Eastern Europe. Norway, Noragric, SEE Programme in Agriculture;
2002 – 2006: National contact person for project: Identification and Conservation of Animal Genetic Resources in South Eastern Europe Norway, Noragric, SEE Programme in Agriculture;
2003 – on going. National contact person. Regional network about animal genetic resources in the Balkan, coordinated by “Save the foundation”, Switzerland.
2007. Implementation of research project about “Lacaune” sheep breed in Kosovo. Cooperation project between the Faculty of Agriculture and Veterinary and USAID.
2010 - 2011: Hysen Bytyqi – National project coordinator: „Cooperation in academic, scientific and professional fields between Faculty of Agriculture & Veterinary in Prishtina and University of Natural Resources and Applied Life Sciences, Vienna”, specifically Project No. 4: Project Title: "Breeding program for sheep farmers in Kosovo".
2011 – on going: Hysen Bytyqi – National project coordinator: Mineral improved food and feed crops for human and animal health. Programme in Higher Education, Research and Development in the Western Balkans 2010–2013 the Agriculture Sector (HERD/Agriculture) Project Application Form (Project contact person for Faculty of Agriculture and veterinary). 
2011 – on going : Hysen Bytyqi – National project coordinator: Study of autochthon cattle “BUSHA” in Kosovo. Application for special research funds from the Ministry of Education Science and Technology (MEST) - Project submitted.
2011 – on going: Hysen Bytyqi – National project coordinator: Kosovo Milk Safety and Quality Assessment - Risks Associated with Smallholder Farms. Project is in cooperation with University of Prishtina – Faculty of Agriculture and Veterinary and University of Wisconsin and University of Minnesota, USA. 2014. Hysen Bytyqi – Project Coordinator: Study of Buffalo Milk in Kosova. Application for special research funds from the Ministry of Education Science and Technology (MEST).

Research engagements 
 Regional Network for the Animal Genetic Resources in the Balcans, Foundation Switzerland
 Animal Breeding and Farm management, Swiss College of Agriculture – Bern
 Regional Meeting: Branding of the Products and Regions. International Conference Center in Leipzig-Zschortau, Germany
 Animal Breeding and statistic modeling of survival, productive and reproductive traits of dual-purpose cattle, milk test day model. Animal Science and Aquaculture, University of Life Sciences, Norway
 Training about the “Mary Carry” programs
 Training about research and development initiatives (Leoben-Austria; Sapienza-Italy; Oxford-UK)

Publications (selection) 
 Bytyqi. H., G. Klemetsdal, J. Ødegård, H. Mehmeti, and M. Vegara. A comparison of the productive, reproductive and body condition score traits of the Simmental, Brown Swiss and Tyrol Grey breeds in smallholder herds in Kosovo. Anim. Genet. Res. Inf.  37: 9-20. 2005
Bytyqi. H., J. Ødegård, M. Vegara, H. Mehmeti, and G. Klemetsdal. Short Communication: Lactation Curves and production efficiency for Simmental, Brown Swiss and Tyrol Grey in Kosovo. Section – B, Volume 56, Issue 3 & 4, pages 161–164. 2006
 Bytyqi. H., J. Ødegård, H. Mehmeti, M. Vegara, and G. Klemetsdal. Environmental Sensitivity of Milk Production in Extensive Environments: A comparison of Simmental, Brown Swiss and Tyrol Grey using Random Regression Models. J. Dairy. Sci, 90: 3883–3888, 2007
 M. Cinkulov, Z. Popovski, K. Porco, B. Tanaskovska, A. Hodjic, H. Bytyqi, H. Mehmeti, V. Margeta, R. Djedovic, A. Hoda, R. Trailovic, M. Brka, B. Markovic, B. Vasic, M. Vegara, I. Olsaker, and J. Kantanen. Genetic diversity and structure of the West Balkan Pramenka sheep types as revealed by microsatellite and mitochondriale DNA analysis. Journal of Animal Breeding and Genetics, Volume 125, Issue 6, 417 – 426. 2008
 Bytyqi Hysen, Vegara Mensur, Gjonbalaj Muje, Mehmeti Hajrip, Gjergjizi Halim, Miftari Iliriana and Bytyqi Njazi*. Analysis of Consumer Behavior in Regard to Dairy Products in Kosovo. J. Agric. Res., 46(3).2008
 Gjonbalaj M1, Miftari I1 2, Pllana, M1, Bytyqi, H1, Fetahu, S1, Gjergjzi, H1, Dragusha, B1. Costumer Behavior in Kosovo Wine Market.Agriculturae Conspectus Scientificus, Croatia Agriculturae Conspectus Scientifi cus | Vol. 74 (2009) No. 4 (333–338), 2009
 Sali Aliu, Shukri Fetahu, Skender Kaciu, Hysen Bytyci. Variation on wild sunflower (Helianthus ruderalis L.) for quantitative and qualitative parameters. Journal of Agriculture science and Technology. USA. Vol. 4.2010
 Hysen Bytyqi;, Urs. Zaugg;. Kurtesh. Sherifi;, Afrim Hamidi;. Mujë Gjonbalaj;, Skender Muji and Hajrip Mehmeti. 2010. Influence of management and physiological factors on somatic cell count in raw cow milk in Kosova. Veterinarski arhiv 80 (2), 173–183. Zagreb, Kroatien 2010
 H Bytyqi, M Rrustemi, H Mehmeti, A Kryeziu, V Gjinovci, M Gjonbalaj. Milk Production in Commercial Cattle Dairy Farms in Kosova Stočarstvo, Zagreb 2010
 Hysen Bytyqi, Stefan Bigler, Skender Muji, Ardita Jahja and Urs Zaugg. Survey on Raw Milk Qualityin Kosovo. Food and Nutrition Sciences, 2011
Ivica Medugorac, Claudia E. Veit-Kensch, Jelena Ramljak, Muhamed Brka, Božidarka Markovič, Srđan Stojanović, Hysen Bytyqi, Kristaq Kume, Hans-Peter Grünenfelder, Jörn Bennewitz, and Martin Förster. Conservation of genetic diversity in a metapopulation: A study in traditional unselected cattle breeds. Ecology and Evolution (Ecol Evol. 2011 November; 1(3): 408–420. doi:  10.1002/ece3.39. 2011 
 Bytyqi, H1*, P. Ruegg2, F. Rrusetmaj3. P. Kastrati1, S. Wells4. A Study of the Somatic Cell Count of Kosovo Bulk Milk Farm Management and Perspective. Albanian j. agric. sci. 2014 (Special edition). pp. 317 - 323. Publ. Date: 20 June 2014
Hysen Bytyqi, Roswitha Baumung, Hajrip Mehmeti, Birgit Fuerst-Waltl. Phenotypic characterization and description of production systems of autochthonous of sheep breeds in Kosovo. Animal Genetic Resources, 2014, 54, 163–170. © Food and Agriculture Organization of the United Nations, 2014 doi:10.1017/S20786336140 00034. 2014 
A Ademi, E Govasmark, A Bernhoft, H Bytyqi, M Djikic, M Manojlović, Z Loncaric, M Drinic, A Filipovic, BR Singh; Title: Status of selenium in sheep and dairy cow blood in Western Balkan countries. Acta Agriculturae Scandinavica, Section A— Animal Science, 1–8. DOI:10.1080/09064702.201 5.1048712. 2015
Bytyqi Hysen, Birgit Fuerst-Waltl, Hajrip Mehmeti, Roswitha Baumung; Title: "Economic values for production traits for different sheep breeds in Kosovo". Italian Journal Of Animal Science 2015; volume 14: 3808. 2015
Hysen Bytyqi* ; Kaltrina Berisha; Afrim Hamidi; Driton Sylejmani; Mentor Thaqi: A Survey on Traditional Cheese Production and Diversity in Kosovo. Bulgarian Journal of Agricultural Science, 23 (No 1) 2017, 42–4. 2017
A. Ademi 2*, A. Bernhoft†, E. Govasmark, H. Bytyqi§, Sivertsen# and B. R. Singh. Selenium and other mineral concentrations in feed and sheep's blood in Kosovo. Transl. Anim. Sci. 2017.1:97–107 doi:10.2527/tas2016.0010. 2017
Mehmeti, I.,Bytyqi, H.,Muji, S.,Nes, I.F.,Diep, D.B.. The prevalence of listeria monocytogenes and staphylococcus aureus and their virulence genes in bulk tank milk in Kosovo. J Infect Dev Ctries  2017; 11(3):247-254. 2017
Anila Hoda, Hysen Bytyqi: Genetic diversity of sheep breeds from Albania and Kosova by microsatellite markers. Albanian Journal of Agricultural Sciences, 6-10 . 2017
Jelena Ramljak, Gjoko Bunevski, Hysen Bytyqi, Božidarka Marković,¶ Muhamed Brka, Ante Ivanković, Kristaq Kume, Srđan Stojanović, Vasil Nikolov, Mojca Simčič, Johann Solkner, Elisabeth Kunz, Sophie Rothammer, Doris Seichter, HansPeter Grunenfelder, Elli T. Broxham, Waltraud Kugler, and Ivica Medugorac  Conservation of a domestic metapopulation structured into related and partly admixed strains. Molecular Ecology: 27 (7), 1633–1650. 2018 
Kaltrina Berisha; Hysen Bytyqi, Driton Sylejmani; Hajrip Mehmeti; Afrim Hamidi:Technological Process of Preparation of Meat Sheep in Traditional Way in Kosovo. Bulgarian Journal of Agricultural Science 24 (3), 515–520. 2018
K Berisha, M Thaqi, H Bytyqi: Traditional Cottage Cheese production in Kosovo. Food Science and Applied Biotechnology 1 (2), 125130. 2018

Literature 
 Manfred G. Raupp Hrsg: The fight against malaria and other related mosquito-born diseases : results and proposed next steps of the Rotary Seminar at the University Prishtina (Kosovo), ICC Deutschland Türkei, Rotary International 2019

External links 
 Hasen Byryqi on Google Scholar
 Hysen Bytyqi on researchgate
 Hysen Bytyqi in the University Wisconsin-Madison USA

References 

Living people
People from Pristina
Kosovan scientists
University of Pristina alumni
Academic staff of the University of Pristina
1968 births